Trish is a feminine given name, often a contraction of Patricia. It may refer to:

Persons
Trish Adudu (born 1969), British freelance journalist, television presenter and DJ
Trish Bartholomew (born 1986), Grenadian sprinter
Trish Bertram, British television host and voice-over artist
Trish Costello, American entrepreneur and businesswoman
Trish Crossin (born 1956), Australian politician
Trish Delaney-Brown, Australian singer and songwriter
Trish Deseine, Northern Ireland food and cookbook author
Trish Doan (born 1985), South Korean bass player 
Trish Draper (born 1959), Australian politician 
Trish Flavel (born 1976), Australian Paralympic athlete 
Trish Godman (born 1939), Scottish politician 
Trish Goff (born 1976), American model
Trish Johnson (born 1966), English professional golfer
Trish Karter, American entrepreneur and businesswoman 
Trish Keenan (1968–2011), English musician, front woman of Broadcast
Trish Kissiar-Knight, American volleyball coach
Trish McKelvey (born 1942), New Zealand cricketer
Trish Murphy, American singer-songwriter
Trish Regan (born 1976), American television host, journalist, financial expert, and author
Trish Salah, Canadian feminist writer and educator
Trish Shields, Canadian poet and novelist
Trish Sie, American choreographer and director
Trish Stewart (born 1946), American television actress
Trish Stratus (born 1975), Greek Canadian wrestler, former fitness model, actress and television personality
Trish Suhr (born 1974), American standup comedian 
Trish Thuy Trang, Vietnamese American singer, and songwriter
Trish Van Devere (born 1943), American actress
Trish Vradenburg (born 1946), American playwright, author, television writer, and Alzheimer’s Disease advocate
Trish White (born 1964), Australian businesswoman and former politician
Trish Williamson (1955–2007), English TV presenter, producer, and filmmaker
Trish Worth (born 1946), Australian politician
Trish Wylie, Irish author of romance novels

Fictional characters
Patricia "Trish" Tracy, in the 1997 television movie On the 2nd Day of Christmas
Trish (Devil May Cry), from the video game series Devil May Cry
Trish, from the upcoming indie video game Goodbye Volcano High
Trish, from the film Message from the King
Trish Murtaugh, in the 1987 American buddy cop action movie Lethal Weapon
Trish Piedmont, in the 2005 American romantic comedy movie The 40-Year-Old Virgin
Trish Sackett, in the movie 13 Going on 30 
Trish Tilby, in the Marvel Comics Universe
Trish Una, from Vento Aureo, the fifth story arc of the Japanese manga series "JoJo's Bizarre Adventure"
Trish Wallace, in the UK soap opera Family Affairs
Trish De La Rosa, from the Disney Channel Series Austin & Ally

See also
Trisha
Tricia

Feminine given names
Hypocorisms